The Cathedral of the Lord Good Jesus of the Remedies is a religious building affiliated to the Catholic Church located in the city of Afogados da Ingazeira, in the state of Pernambuco in the Northeast region of Brazil.

The cathedral follows the Roman or Latin rite and serves as the mother church or main church of the Roman Catholic Diocese of Afogados da Ingazeira (Dioecesis Afogadensis de Ingazeira) that was created in 1956 through the bull "Qui volente Deo" of Pope Pius XII.

It is under the pastoral responsibility of Bishop Egidio Bisol. With the help of the municipal authorities, a 24-point lighting system using LED technology was installed in the cathedral in 2015.

See also
Catholic Church in Brazil

Notes

References

Roman Catholic cathedrals in Pernambuco
Afogados da Ingazeira